Alder Community High School is a state funded secondary school in Hyde, Greater Manchester, England. The School was built under the Private Funding Initiative (PFI) by Interserve, a major government investment programme designed to bring Britain's secondary schools into the 21st Century.
It has around 800 pupils. It is a computing and maths specialist school which features multiple suites running on Windows 10 Enterprise edition.

Secondary schools in Tameside
Community schools in Tameside
Hyde, Greater Manchester
Specialist maths and computing colleges in England